Ixlu is a small Maya archaeological site that dates to the Classic and Postclassic Periods. It is located on the isthmus between the Petén Itzá and Salpetén lakes, in the northern Petén Department of Guatemala. The site was an important port with access to Lake Petén Itzá via the Ixlu River. The site has been identified as Saklamakhal, also spelt Saclemacal, a capital of the Kowoj Maya.

The site has over 150 structures, the majority of which in the site core display typically Postclassic characteristics. The site was briefly investigated by Don and Prudence Rice in 1980.

Occupation
Archaeological investigations have uncovered potsherds dating as far back as the early Middle Preclassic (1000 BC–800 BC). Evidence from the Temple of the Hidden Jars indicates a continuous occupation from the Preclassic right through the Classic (AD 200–900) to the Postclassic Period (AD 900–1525), with occupation continuing until approximately 1700, well after the Spanish Conquest of most of Guatemala, according to ethnohistoric sources. The Petén Lakes region finally fell to the Spanish Crown in 1697, at which time Ixlu was in disputed territory between the mutually hostile Itza and Kowoj kingdoms.

Structures
Fifty structures have been mapped at Ixlu by the Central Peten Historical Ecology Project. Nine of these are C-shaped bench superstructures and two are L-shaped.

Ixlu has two ballcourts and is one of only two Postclassic sites in the central Petén lakes region to have a recognisable ballcourt. However, both ballcourts at Ixlu apparently date to the Late Classic. The site possesses a twin pyramid complex, a feature that is rare outside of Tikal and probably indicates the political influence of that great city.

The architecture at Ixlu resembles that at the Late Classic site of Seibal on the Pasión River.

The Temple of the Hidden Jars
The Temple of the Hidden Jars (Templo de las Vasijas Escondidas) has been labelled as Structure 2034. The temple has been dated to the Late Postclassic Period (AD 1200-1525). A stairway ascended the west side of the temple and there was an altar on the summit that measured . The temple is named from two hidden niches on the west side of the temple, one at the foot of the stairway and the second under an altar on the temple steps. The vessels have four handles spaced equidistantly around the circumference, with the lids also possessing a handle. The jars contained only brown soil. This style of hidden niche is similar to niches associated with ceremonial structures in distant Mayapan in the north of the Yucatán Peninsula.

Monuments

Four Classic Period sculpted monuments were recovered from the site, two stelae and two altars. Ixlu Stela 1 bears the date 879 AD, in the Late Classic Period, and depicts a ruler who used the Tikal Emblem Glyph and the K'ul Mutul Ahaw title ("holy lord of Tikal"). The stelae at Ixlu resemble traditional Classic Period stelae such as those at Tikal. Both Stelae 1 and 2 show bloodletting rituals and the materialisation of the Paddler Gods. Ixlu Stela 2 is now located in the main plaza of Flores.

The monuments of Ixlu bear some hieroglyphic texts that closely resemble texts from the site of Dos Pilas, suggesting that the lords of Ixlu may have been refugees from the collapse of that state in the Petexbatún region of the Petén Basin, a state that itself professed to have a legitimate claim to the rulership of Tikal.

See also
Topoxte
List of Maya sites

Notes

References

Further reading
 

Maya sites in Petén Department
Former populated places in Guatemala
18th-century disestablishments in Guatemala
Populated places established in the 10th century BC
10th-century BC establishments in the Maya civilization
Maya Contact Period
Maya sites that survived the end of the Classic Period